Feodor Grigorovich Chuchin (1883-1942) was an official in the Soviet government who was chairman of the campaign to eliminate illiteracy. He also was an author on numismatic and philatelic topics.

Early life and family
Feodor Chuchin was born in 1883.

Career
As an official in the Soviet government, he was chairman of the campaign to eliminate illiteracy.

In 1924, he published Bumazhnye Denezhnye Znaki (paper banknotes) which has become a standard work on the subject.

In 1925, as Commissioner for Philately, Chuchin published his Catalogue of the Russian Rural Stamps, the local stamps of Russia known as Zemstvo stamps, the numbering system of which has become the standard used for those issues.

In 1984, John Barefoot published a revised edition of Chuchin's catalogue as volume 14 of his European Philately series.

Death
Chuchin died in 1942.

Selected publications
 Bumazhnye Denezhnye Znaki (Paper Banknotes). Moscow, 1924. (Russian language)
 Catalogue of the Russian Rural Stamps. Commissioner for Philately and Vouchers of U.S.S.R., Moscow, 1925.
 Russia Zemstvos. Revised edition. Edited by John Barefoot. J. Barefoot Ltd., York, 1984.

See also
 Organisation of the Commissioner for Philately and Scripophily

References

External links 

1883 births
1942 deaths
Philatelic authors
Russian numismatists